Sălard is a commune in Bihor County, Crișana, Romania. It is composed of three villages: Hodoș (Jákóhodos), Sălard, and Sântimreu (Hegyközszentimre).

The commune is located in the northwestern part of the county, on the banks of the river Barcău. The river Sânnicolau discharges into the Barcău near Sântimreu.

Sălard is crossed by national road , which runs from Biharia,  to the southwest, to Chiribiș,  to the northeast. The county capital, Oradea, is 27 km to the south.

References

Communes in Bihor County
Localities in Crișana